Stadtoldendorf is a town in the center of the Holzminden district, Lower Saxony, Germany. Stadtoldendorf is the seat of the Samtgemeinde ("collective municipality") Eschershausen-Stadtoldendorf.

Government 
Allocation of seats in the local council electoral period 2006-2011:

 CDU: 10
 SPD: 5
 Grünen: 1
 FDP: 1

Culture

Museums
 Stadtmuseum im Charlotte-Leitzen-Haus
 Freilichtmuseum Mühlenanger

Buildings
 Försterbergturm, from the 13th century
 Hagentorturm
 Kellbergturm
 Homburg castle, above old village
 Altes Rathaus (from 1875)
 Ratskeller (from 1621)
 Charlotte-Leitzen-Haus

Notable people 

 Kurt Matzdorf (1922 – 2008), metalsmith, professor

References 

Towns in Lower Saxony
Holzminden (district)
Duchy of Brunswick